The New-York Open Board of Stock Brokers was a stock exchange in New York City. Shortly after being formed, the New-York Open Board of Stock Brokers held their first annual election on February 21, 1877. 87 votes were cast at the Delmonico's Building on New Street. B. M. Nevers was elected president. E. T. Bragaw, former vice president of the New-York Gold Exchange was elected chairman. The building of the old Open Board of Stock Brokers was commissioned as the new permanent location of the exchange, with an initial membership of 272 and memberships pending.

See also
 
List of former stock exchanges in the Americas 
List of stock exchange mergers in the Americas
 Economy of New York City

References

Former stock exchanges in the United States